"Sitting, Waiting, Wishing" is a song written and sung by Jack Johnson. It is the sixth song on the album In Between Dreams, which was released in February 2005. It was released as a single in January 2005.

The music video features reverse narration, similar to Coldplay's video for "The Scientist". The song was inspired by one of his friends' pursuit of a woman.

The single, "Sitting, Waiting, Wishing" only became a chart hit in the United Kingdom after the re-release climbed into the Top 75 following Jack Johnson's exposure on the 2006 BRIT Awards on ITV1. The single climbed to hit status a week before the release of "Better Together". Both the original release and indeed the re-issue had failed to chart until this point. However, the single was nominated for a Grammy Award in the category of Best Male Pop Vocal Performance. Additionally, it was nominated for Best Male Video at the MTV Video Music Awards Japan ceremony in 2006.

Background
Johnson explains the inspiration behind the song by saying: "A friend of mine was trying to get this girl named Michelle," said Johnson, "and I tried to write a song that would help him have a laugh at himself because he was spending so much time trying to get her and it obviously wasn't leading anywhere. That was one just to cheer up a friend."

Track listing

CD single
 "Sitting, Waiting, Wishing" - 3:09
 "Free" (with Donavon Frankenreiter) - 2:35

German single
 "Sitting, Waiting, Wishing" - 03:09
 "Free" (with Donavon Frankenreiter) - 2:35
 "Give It To You" (with G.Love) - 03:22
 "Taylor" (Video)

Charts

1 = re-issue

Certifications

References

2005 singles
Jack Johnson (musician) songs
Songs written by Jack Johnson (musician)
Music videos directed by The Malloys
Song recordings produced by Mario Caldato Jr.